Chiveh (also Romanized as Chīveh; also known as Sarak, Sarrāk, and Sarrāk Chīv) is a village in Howmeh-ye Sharqi Rural District, in the Central District of Izeh County, Khuzestan Province, Iran. At the 2006 census, its population was 96, in 17 families.

References 

Populated places in Izeh County